Rui Filipe Caetano Moura (born 1 March 1993), known as Carraça, is a Portuguese professional footballer who plays as a midfielder for Gil Vicente F.C. on loan from FC Porto.

Formed at Boavista, he made over 130 Primeira Liga appearances, also representing Porto as well as on loan at Belenenses SAD and Gil Vicente.

Club career

Boavista
Born in Folgosa, Maia, Carraça earned his nickname meaning "tick" for his aggressive style of play while at his village club. He finished his development at Boavista F.C. after joining at the age of 16; his first two seasons as a senior were spent in the third division.

From 2014 to 2016, Carraça competed in the Segunda Liga on loan, respectively with C.D. Tondela and C.D. Santa Clara. While with the former team, his first professional game occurred on 31 August 2014 when he played the second half of a 1–1 home draw against Académico de Viseu FC. He contributed eight starts and 809 minutes of action, in an eventual first-ever promotion to the Primeira Liga.

Returned to the Estádio do Bessa for the 2016–17 campaign, Carraça made his debut in the competition on 14 August 2016, playing the entire 2–0 home win over F.C. Arouca. His first league goal arrived on 21 October, awarding the visitors one point with a 1–1 draw at C.S. Marítimo.

A key played under both Erwin Sánchez and his successor Miguel Leal, Carraça renewed his contract with Boavista on 28 December 2016, with the new link running until June 2018.

Porto
On 12 August 2020, Carraça signed a four-year contract with FC Porto. He took no part in the team until 21 November, when he started in a 2–0 victory at G.D. Fabril in the third round of the Taça de Portugal.

Carraça was loaned to Belenenses SAD on 24 August 2021, for the season. Having provided three assists and missed only eight games as the Lisbon-based side suffered relegation, he moved to Gil Vicente F.C. on the same basis.

Career statistics

Honours
Tondela
Segunda Liga: 2014–15

References

External links

1993 births
Living people
People from Maia, Portugal
Sportspeople from Porto District
Portuguese footballers
Association football midfielders
Primeira Liga players
Liga Portugal 2 players
Segunda Divisão players
Boavista F.C. players
C.D. Tondela players
C.D. Santa Clara players
FC Porto players
FC Porto B players
Belenenses SAD players
Gil Vicente F.C. players